Murilo Melo Filho (13 October 1928 - 27 May 2020) was a Brazilian author, journalist and politician. He was a member of the Academia Brasileira de Letras, an elite group of 40 writers and poets similar to France's Académie Française, occupying Chair no 20, in succession to Aurélio de Lira Tavares. He was also a member of the regional Academia Norte-Riograndense de Letras, occupying Chair no 19. He was a member of the administrative council of the Associação Brasileira de Imprensa (the Brazilian Press Association)

He was born in Natal, Rio Grande do Norte, the son of Murilo Melo and Hermínia de Freitas Melo. He worked on A República, a periodical published in his home town. From 1952 to 1958 he worked on the Tribuna da Imprensa under Carlos Lacerda.

References

1928 births
2020 deaths
People from Natal, Rio Grande do Norte
Pontifical Catholic University of Rio de Janeiro alumni
Federal University of Rio de Janeiro alumni
Brazilian writers
Brazilian journalists
Brazilian politicians